Georges Louis Marie Dumont de Courset (16 September 1746 – 3 September 1824) was a French botanist and agronomist. Born near Boulogne, he studied in Paris and showed an aptitude for music and drawing.

He joined the military when he was 17 and became a second lieutenant. Sent to the south of France, he visited the Pyrenees and caught a passion for botany. He gave up his military career and returned home to build an extensive garden that became famous for the diversity of plant species. The garden was a noteworthy example of cultivation without a natural water spring source

He tried to influence the agricultural techniques employed in his area. Protected by scientists like André Thouin (1746–1824) during the Revolution, he became corresponding member of the French Academy of Agriculture.

He published five volumes on the Botaniste cultivateur, ou description, culture et usage de la plus grande partie des plantes étrangères, naturalisées et indigènes, naturalisées et indigènes, cultivées en France et en Angleterre, rangées suivant la méthode de Jussieu in 1802. Later he entirely re-examined the work and re-issued it in six volumes (1811). In these volumes, Dumont de Courset described 8,700 species and indicated their characteristics and their cultivation.

Publications

References

 This article is based on a translation from the French Wikipedia
 Louis-Gabriel Michaud (1855). Biographie universelle ancienne et moderne. Mme C. Desplaces (Paris).

External links 

 

Dumont de Courset, George Louis Marie
1746 births
1824 deaths
18th-century French botanists